France will compete at the 2009 World Championships in Athletics from 15 to 23 August. A team of 67 athletes was announced in preparation for the competition. Selected athletes have achieved one of the competition's qualifying standards. Both of the country's medallists from the last Championships, Romain Mesnil and Yohann Diniz, are competing, as well as the emerging talents of Mahiedine Mekhissi-Benabbad and Renaud Lavillenie.

Team selection

Track and road events

Field and combined events

Results

Men
Track and road events

Field events

Women
Track and road events

Field and combined events

References

External links
Official competition website

Nations at the 2009 World Championships in Athletics
World Championships in Athletics
France at the World Championships in Athletics